There were three Imperial Orders of the Mexican Empire, which were Orders of chivalry created to reward Heads of state and prominent people during the two periods of the Mexican Empire—the , the Imperial Order of the Mexican Eagle (Spanish: Orden Imperial del Águila Mexicana), and the  (Spanish: Imperial Orden de San Carlos).

Imperial Order of Guadalupe

  The Order of Guadalupe (originally: "National Order of Our Lady of Guadalupe") was established by Emperor Agustín I of Mexico in the fall of 1821, although its statutes would not be published until February 1822. It was originally divided into two classes: Grand Cross and Numerary Member. After the death of the Agustin I, the Order fell out of use and remained inactive for 30 years until Antonio López de Santa Anna convinced Pope Pius IX to recognize it in 1854. It fell into disuse again in August of that same year after the successful Ayutla Revolution and the ousting of Santa Anna from government. The third and last period of the Order began on June 30, 1863, before the arrival of Maximilian I of Mexico, by decree of the Provisional Imperial Government.

 

Emperor Maximilian I modified the statutes of the Order for the last time on April 10, 1865, renaming the order "Imperial" (instead of "National") and divided it into four ranks, each with civilian and military divisions:
 Grand Cross, limited to 30 recipients.
 Grand Officer, limited to 100 recipients.
 Commander, limited to 200 recipients.
 Knight, limited to 500 recipients.

Grand Crosses
 François Achille Bazaine
 Carlota of Mexico
 Frederick III, German Emperor
 Gabino Gaínza
 Alexander Gorchakov
 Alexander von Humboldt
 Isabella II of Spain
 Salvador de Iturbide y Marzán
 Agustín Jerónimo de Iturbide y Huarte
 Kamehameha V
 Leopold I of Belgium
 Richard von Metternich
 Napoleon III
 Napoléon, Prince Imperial
 Queen Victoria
Grand Officers
Commanders
 Louis Antoine Debrauz de Saldapenna
 Ludwig von Fautz
Knights
 Luigi Calori
Unknown Classes
 Vicente Guerrero
 Agustín de Iturbide
 Gustave Léon Niox
 Wilhelm von Tegetthoff

Imperial Order of the Mexican Eagle

  The Imperial Order of the Mexican Eagle was created by Maximilian I on January 1, 1865. It consisted of two classes: the Superior Class only available to Heads of State, awarded a Grand Cross with Collar; and the Ordinary Class, consisting of the following ranks:
 Grand Cross
 Grand Officer
 Commander
 Officer
 Knight

The award survives partially (in name at least) in the modern Mexican Order of the Aztec Eagle.

Imperial Order of Saint Charles

  The Imperial Order of Saint Charles was created by Maximilian I on April 10, 1866. It was awarded exclusively to women who excelled in the service of their community. The Order honoured Saint Charles Borromeo, Patron Saint of Empress Carlota, sovereign of the Order.  It was divided into two classes: the Grand Cross, awarded to only 24 Ladies; and the Cross, without any limit upon the number of women who might receive it.

Grand Crosses 

Some Ladies Grand Cross of the Order of Saint Charles include:
 Queen Victoria of the United Kingdom
 Elizabeth of Bavaria, Empress of Austria and Queen of Hungary (Sissi), consort of Franz Joseph I of Austria, Charlotte's sister-in-law
 Marie Henriette of Austria, Queen of Belgium, consort of Leopold II of Belgium, Charlotte's sister-in-law
 Maria Amalia of Naples and Sicily, former Queen of France, consort of Louis Philippe I, Charlotte's maternal grandmother
 Queen Isabella II of Spain
 Amélie of Leuchtenberg, Empress Dowager of Brazil, 2nd consort of Pedro I of Brazil
 Teresa Cristina of the Two Sicilies, Empress of Brazil, consort of Pedro II of Brazil
 Princess Leopoldina of Brazil
 Louise of Hesse-Kassel, Queen of Denmark, consort of Christian IX of Denmark
 Eugenia María de Montijo de Guzmán, Empress of France, consort of Napoleon III
 María Manuela Kirkpatrick de Closebrun, Countess of Montijo y de Teba, Empress Eugénie's mother
 Princess Anne Murat, Duchess of Mouchy, daughter of Prince Lucien Murat

 Maria Pia of Savoy, Queen of Portugal, consort of Luís I of Portugal
 Augusta of Saxe-Weimar-Eisenach, Queen de Prussia, consort of future William I, German Emperor
 Victoria, Princess Royal, Future German Empress and Queen of Prussia, consort of future Frederick III, German Emperor
 Maria Feodorovna (Dagmar of Denmark), Empress of Russia, consort of Alexander III of Russia
 Amalie Auguste of Bavaria, Queen of Saxony, consort of John of Saxony
 Josephine of Leuchtenberg, Queen Mother of Sweden & Norway, consort of Oscar I of Sweden
 Louise of the Netherlands, Queen of Sweden & Norway, consort of Charles XV of Sweden
 Gertrudis Enríquez y Sequera de Suárez de Peredo Hurtado de Mendoza, Countess del Valle de Orizaba, her Chamberlain's wife.

See also
 First Mexican Empire
 Second Mexican Empire
 Imperial Crown of Mexico
 Mexican nobility
 Mexican Honours System
 Order of the Aztec Eagle

References

Sources
 Encuentra.com: The Popes and the Virgin of Guadalupe - in Spanish
 This article draws heavily on the corresponding article in the Spanish-language Wikipedia, which was accessed in the version of August 21, 2005.

External links
 Imperial House of Mexico

Imperial Orders
Imperial Orders
 
Imperial Orders
Titles of nobility in the Americas